Robin Lord Taylor (born June 4, 1978) is an American film and television actor and director, known for his role as Oswald Cobblepot in the Fox TV series Gotham, as well as Accepted (2006), Another Earth (2011), Would You Rather (2012), John Wick: Chapter 3 – Parabellum (2019) and You (2019).

Early life
Taylor was born in Shueyville, Iowa, to Robert Harmon Taylor and Mary Susan (née Stamy) Taylor. He attended Solon High School and Northwestern University, earning his Bachelor of Science degree in Theatre in 2000. While at Northwestern, his roommate was actor Billy Eichner.

Career
Taylor has appeared in several television series, such as The Walking Dead, Law & Order, Law & Order: Special Victims Unit, The Good Wife and Person of Interest. He had a recurring role as "Darrell, the Late Show page with the fake British accent" on Late Show with David Letterman. He played Abernathy Darwin Dunlap in Accepted. He appeared in such independent films as Would You Rather, Cold Comes the Night, and Another Earth, the last of which won the Alfred P. Sloan Prize at the 2011 Sundance Film Festival.

Taylor was featured in Spike Lee's segment "Jesus Children of America" of the 2005 anthology film on the theme of childhood and exploitation All the Invisible Children (Venice Film Festival), The House is Burning (produced by Wim Wenders (Cannes Film Festival), Pitch (Cannes Film Festival), Kevin Connolly's Gardener of Eden (Tribeca Film Festival) and Assassination of a High School President (Sundance Film Festival).
 
Taylor co-created and co-starred in Creation Nation: A Live Talk Show with Billy Eichner, which they performed at the 2008 Edinburgh Festival Fringe, as well as at the HBO Aspen Comedy Festival and throughout New York City and Los Angeles. He has also appeared onstage in Neighborhood 3: Requisition of Doom, The Shooting Stage, Henry IV and No. 11 Blue and White, as well as numerous productions in Stephen Sondheim's Young Playwrights Festival at the Cherry Lane Theater.

In February 2019, it was announced that Taylor had been cast in the recurring role of Will Bettelheim on the second season of the Netflix thriller series You.

Gotham
Taylor was cast as Oswald Cobblepot in February 2014. His performance as Cobblepot has been described by Esquire as a "standout performance of the first episode [...], disarming and multilayered", by The Wall Street Journal as "a passionate performance ... [that] steals the show", and as "spectacularly cast as the Penguin".

Personal life
Since 2000, Taylor has lived in Manhattan, New York, where Gotham was filmed.

In a November 2014 Glamour interview, Taylor was asked, "I notice you are wearing a wedding ring on your ring finger. Are you married?" To which he responded, "I am married! I like to keep it private, but I've been married for over three years, and we've been together for 5½ years. No kids. No kids yet!"

In March 2015, Slate noted Taylor in an article discussing "Several actors who are openly gay or who have been cast in multiple straight or bisexual roles and the typecasting of gay roles". Taylor, himself, added: "I feel like the landscape has totally changed. Regardless of sexual preference, it's more that as a character actor, the less I reveal about myself, the better. My favorite actors are the ones I know least about." In April 2015, Taylor openly identified as gay on episode 672 of The Nerdist Podcast with Chris Hardwick. In honor of National Coming Out Day in October 2019, Taylor revealed on Instagram that he had been out as gay for 22 years and encouraged followers to donate to the non-profit Rainbow Railroad.

Filmography

Film

Television

Video game

References

External links

 
 
 
 

1978 births
Living people
American male film actors
American male television actors
American people of English descent
American people of German descent
American people of Scottish descent
American gay actors
LGBT people from Iowa
Male actors from Iowa
Northwestern University alumni
People from Solon, Iowa
21st-century American male actors